The 1997 Ballon d'Or, given to the best football player in Europe as judged by a panel of sports journalists from UEFA member countries, was awarded to Ronaldo on 23 December 1997.

Rankings

Additionally, fourteen players were nominated but received no votes: Sonny Anderson, Enrico Chiesa, Hernán Crespo, Iván de la Peña, Robbie Fowler, Thomas Häßler, Thomas Helmer, Filippo Inzaghi, Gianluca Pagliuca, Robert Pires, Karl-Heinz Riedle, Sergi, Davor Šuker and Ian Wright.

References

External links
 France Football Official Ballon d'Or page

1997
1997–98 in European football